Madras Rajagopalan Radhakrishnan Ravi (born 29 July 1952) is an Indian actor and politician who played supporting roles throughout his career. He is the son of actor M. R. Radha and the uncle of Vasu Vikram and half-brother of Raadhika. He is a former chief member of the Tamil Nadu Film Artistes' Association. He is known for his roles as antagonists in Tamil films and a he acted in the serial Chellamae. He is also known for his controversial criticism of other film personalities. The following is a complete list of his films:

Tamil films

Kannada 
 Rahasya Rathri (1979)
 Parva (2002)
 Alone (2015)

Malayalam 
 Evidence (1988)
 Kulapathi (1993)
 Customs Diary  (1993)
 Dadha (1994)
 Sundarimare Sookshikkuka (1995)
 Vettam (2004)

Telugu 
 Maha Yagnam (1991)
 Aswamedham  (1992)
 Satya 2 (2013)
 Rakshasudu (2019)

Television

Dubbing artist

Producer 
Idhu Namma Bhoomi (1991)
Thai Maasam Poo Vaasam (1991)
Ilaignar Ani (1994)
Chinna Muthu (1994)

References

External links 
 

Indian filmographies
Male actor filmographies